is a railway station located in Nishi-3-jō, 8-chōme, Shibetsu, Kamikawa Subprefecture, Hokkaidō, and is operated by the Hokkaidō Railway Company.

Lines Serviced
JR Hokkaidō
Sōya Main Line

Adjacent stations

External links

Railway stations in Hokkaido Prefecture
Railway stations in Japan opened in 1900